Klinga or Klingen is a village in Namsos municipality in Trøndelag county, Norway. The village is located about halfway between the villages of Bangsund and Spillum along the Norwegian County Road 17.

The dominant industries have been industry, agriculture, and forestry. The development of the main roads through the village was slow. In 1922, the important Namsen river bridge was completed so that traffic between the town of Namsos and the village of Klinga could occur regardless of the uncertain ferry connections. In 1928, the state took over road maintenance on main roads and eventually developed a road link to the south and east of Klinga. 

The Church of Norway has a parish of Klinga, based at the Klinga Church.  Historically, it was part of the Namsos prestegjeld.  In 1863, the local church was moved from the village of Sævik, just north of Klingen, to the village of Klingen.  In May 1885, the parish was changed from Sævik to Klinga.

References

Villages in Trøndelag
Namsos